Pound (later Flywheel) was an American rock band from Poughkeepsie, New York.

History
Four of the members of Pound were in a New York glam metal band in the early 1990s. Later in the decade, they went on to be signed with EMI Music Publishing working closely with then EMI V.P. Evan Lamberg. Shortly after recording what was to be their first self-titled release they parted ways with original singer Corey Ray DiGiovanni and changed stylistically. In 1999, they signed with Island Records and released their debut album, Same Old Life, produced by Tom Lord-Alge. The album's lead single, "Upside Down", which was co-written by original lead singer Corey Ray DiGiovanni, was a rock radio hit in America, reaching No. 16 on the Billboard Mainstream Rock Tracks chart that year. The group left Island in 2000 and reconstituted itself as Flywheel; its first album under the new name was released in 2003. A follow-up release, also self-titled, appeared in 2005.

POUND recently reunited with its original members Corey Ray DiGiovanni and Pat Gasperini. Currently rehearsing for shows together with Sugar Red Drive drummer PJ Gasperini (Pat's son), they have decided to record and release an album consisting of new material and some original POUND music that pre dates their signing with Island Records. Pound is best known for the 1999 release of "Same Old Life" as well as their chart topping Billboard hit “UPSIDE DOWN”, which reached #15 on Mainstream Rock charts.

The new album is a blend of melodically driven, hard edged radio rock with intricate woven vocal layers that brands the band with a sound all its own. The grinding guitar work of Pat Gasperini mixed with the slamming rhythm sounds from Corey Ray DiGiovanni and PJ Gasperini are the key ingredients of their hard rock songs, each one hitting harder than the next.

Collectively the three members of POUND have performed with: Saliva, Chevelle, Shades Apart, The Wallflowers, Lost Prophets, Candlebox, Tonic, Butch walker / Marvelous 3, Local H, Matchbook Romance, Eve 6, J Geils Band, Jackyl, Smile Empty Soul, Buckcherry, The Cranberries, Collective Soul, Fuel, Sammy Hagar, Def Leppard, The Offspring, Everclear, Kid Rock, Disturbed, Rob Zombie, Zack Wylde (BLS), 7 Mary Three, kings X, Blue Oyster Cult, Cheap Trick, Charlie Daniels Band, Pat Travers, Foghat, Zebra, Peter wolf, J Geils Band, Machine Head, Riot, Puddle of Mudd, Saving Abel, 3 Doors Down, Mudvayne, Black Label Society, Papa Roach, Tom morello, Three Days Grace, Seether, Finger 11, Sick Puppies, Live, We Are The Fallen, Non Point, Cavo, Power Man 5000, Royal Bliss, The Toadies, Danzig, Aranda, Tantric, Fastball, Hinder, Ed Kowalczyk, Black Stone Cherry, Rev theory, Atom Smash, Eve 6, Helmet

Members
Pat Gasperini - vocals, guitar (Pound, Flywheel)
Jason Terwilliger - vocals (Pound), guitar (Pound, Flywheel)
Jerry Terwilliger - drums (Pound, Flywheel)
Corey Ray DiGiovanni - guitar / Vocals ( Pound )
Sandy Nardone - bass (Pound, Flywheel)
Jimmy Crifo - drums (Flywheel)
Stephen Bell - vocals (Flywheel)

Discography
Pound
Same Old Life (Island Records, 1999)

Flywheel
Flywheel (Electric Records, 2003)
Flywheel (2005)

References

External links
Flywheel Official Website
Flywheel at MySpace
[ Pound] at Allmusic
Corey Ray DiGiovanni  Official Website

Musical groups from New York (state)
American post-grunge musical groups